Faraway How is a nunatak in King Christian X Land, East Greenland. Administratively it falls under the Northeast Greenland National Park zone.

This geographic feature was named by the 1926 Cambridge Expedition to East Greenland led by Sir James Wordie.

Geography
Faraway How is located in the Wordie Glacier north of Steno Land and 9 km to the west of C. H. Ostenfeld Nunatak's northern end.

See also
List of mountains in Greenland
List of nunataks of Greenland

Bibliography

References

Faraway
Faraway